Vitta virginea, the Virgin Nerite, is a species of sea snail, a marine gastropod mollusk in the family Neritidae.

Distribution
This species is widespread from the Bahamas, Bermuda, Cuba, West Indies, Greater and Lesser Antilles, Dominica, Puerto Rico, Central America (Panama, Guatemala, Costa Rica), Brazil, Venezuela, Suriname, Colombia, Mexico, Texas and Florida.

Habitat
Vitta virginea can withstand large changes in salinity and therefore may live in freshwaters, in marine and in brackish waters. These sea snails occur in rivers and streams, in estuaries and in the sea, on sand, silt and stones, brackish ponds and mangroves.

Description
These colorful grass-flat snails show extremely variable pattern and color. They are semiglobular, with 3 or 4 whorls. The aperture is oval, with thin lips. Operculum is usually black. The polished shell surface may be black, grey or white, yellowish, olive, red and purple, with various stripes or waves, spots and lines.

Biology
They are herbivorous (algae) and diadromous. They are involved in massive upstream migrations.

References

Bibliography
Blanco-Libreros JF, Arroyave-Rincón A. - Predator damage and shell size on the diadromous snail Neritina virginea (Gastropoda: Neritidae) in the Mameyes River, Puerto Rico 
Cordeiro, J. & Perez, K. 2012. Neritina virginea. The IUCN Red List of Threatened Species 2012: e.T189436A1925495.
Pointier J.P. (ed.). (2015). Freshwater molluscs of Venezuela and their medical and veterinary importance. Harxheim: ConchBooks. 228 pp
Turgeon, D. D., A. E. Bogan, E. V. Coan, W. K. Emerson, W. G. Lyons, W. Pratt, et al. (1988) Common and scientific names of aquatic invertebrates from the United States and Canada: mollusks, American Fisheries Society Special Publication 16
Turgeon, D. D., J. F. Quinn Jr., A. E. Bogan, E. V. Coan, F. G. Hochberg, W. G. Lyons, et al. (1998) Common and scientific names of aquatic invertebrates from the United States and Canada: Mollusks, 2nd ed., American Fisheries Society Special Publication 26
 Eichhorst T.E. (2016). Neritidae of the world. Volume 2. Harxheim: Conchbooks. Pp. 696-1366

External links
 Linnaeus, C. (1758). Systema Naturae per regna tria naturae, secundum classes, ordines, genera, species, cum characteribus, differentiis, synonymis, locis. Editio decima, reformata [10th revised edition, vol. 1: 824 pp. Laurentius Salvius: Holmiae]
 Link, D.H.F. (1807-1808). Beschreibung der Naturalien-Sammlung der Universität zu Rostock. Adlers Erben.
 Röding, P.F. (1798). Museum Boltenianum sive Catalogus cimeliorum e tribus regnis naturæ quæ olim collegerat Joa. Fried Bolten, M. D. p. d. per XL. annos proto physicus Hamburgensis. Pars secunda continens Conchylia sive Testacea univalvia, bivalvia & multivalvia. Trapp, Hamburg. viii, 199 pp.
 Mörch, O. A. L. (1852-1853). Catalogus conchyliorum quae reliquit D. Alphonso d'Aguirra & Gadea Comes de Yoldi, Regis Daniae Cubiculariorum Princeps, Ordinis Dannebrogici in Prima Classe & Ordinis Caroli Tertii Eques. Fasc. 1, Cephalophora, 170 pp.
 conchyliologica 57.pdf Hovestadt A. & Neckheim C. M. (2020). A critical checklist of the non-marine molluscs of St. Martin, with notes on the terrestrial malacofauna of Anguilla and Saint-Barthélemy, and the description of a new subspecies. Folia Conchyliologica. 57: 1-38.

Neritidae
Gastropods described in 1758
Taxa named by Carl Linnaeus